Ambattur railway station is one of the main railway stations of the Chennai Central–Arakkonam section of the Chennai Suburban Railway Network. It serves the neighbourhood of Ambattur, a suburb of Chennai located 17 km west of the city centre. It is situated at Varadarajapuram in Ambattur, with an elevation of 19.18 metres above sea level.

History

The first lines in the station were electrified on 29 November 1979, with the electrification of the Chennai Central–Tiruvallur section. Additional lines at the station were electrified on 2 October 1986, with the electrification of the Villivakkam–Tiruninravur section.

On 21 January 1946 at 4.15 p.m., Mahatma Gandhi visited the station, who was received by Kamaraj.

Layout

The station has Eight tracks, including four loop lines, and has three platforms. The first platform is a side platform and houses the station's entrance and the ticket counter. The second and third platforms lie on an island platform. The platforms are connected by means of a footbridge. A second footbridge built at the level crossing connects the northern and southern sides of the neighbourhood. In 2001, Southern Railways renovated the footbridge at the level crossing at a cost of  400,000.

A railway concrete sleeper manufacturing company was located at the northwestern side of the station until 2015, which is served by loop lines radiating from the station.

As of 2013, the station handles about 50,000 passengers a day. This includes commuters from areas around Ambattur such as Padi, Mannurpet, Karukku, Kallikuppam, Menambedu and Pattaravakkam. Every day, suburban trains make around 260 trips through the station.

Development
According to a railway release in 2008, there are plans to develop the station as a coaching terminal (satellite terminal) for Chennai Central railway station, on the lines of Tambaram station being developed as a terminal for Egmore railway station.

In June 2014, the station was renovated in a major way after decades of neglect. In 2019, work on the extension of platforms to accommodate 24-rake long-distance trains began.

In 2019, the construction work for a new footbridge connecting Platforms 1 and 2 began, replacing the existing one.

See also

 Chennai Suburban Railway
 Railway stations in Chennai

References

External links

 Ambattur station at Indiarailinfo.com

Stations of Chennai Suburban Railway
Railway stations in Chennai
Railway stations in Tiruvallur district